Lugu Subdistrict is a subdistrict located in southern Shijingshan District, Beijing, China. It is bordering Laoshan Subdistrict in the north, Babaoshan Subdistrict in the east, Fengtai District in the south, Gucheng and Bajiao Subdistricts in the west. In the year 2020, the subdistrict had a total of 66,794 people residing within it.

The name Lugu came from a village that used to exist in the area. the subdistrict was formed in 2001.

Administrative Divisions 
Lugu subdistrict was made up of 22 communities as of the year 2021:

See also 
 List of township-level divisions of Beijing

References 

Shijingshan District
Subdistricts of Beijing